John Giacometti (24 December 1936 – 2006) was an Australian former association football player who played as a midfielder.

Club career
Giacometti played club football for APIA in the New South Wales State League.

International career
Born in Italy, Giacometti played three matches for Australia, all against Scotland. He made his debut for the Socceroos on 28 May 1967 in Sydney and played his final match less than a week later on 4 June 1967.

References

1936 births
2006 deaths
Australian soccer players
Association football midfielders
Australia international soccer players